"Be a Man" is the thirteenth and last single by alternative rock band Hole before their breakup in 2002.

The song was co-written by Hole members Courtney Love and Eric Erlandson with contribution from frequent guest Billy Corgan of The Smashing Pumpkins. Released in 2000 as a double A-side (the other track being from P.O.D.) this track also featured on the soundtrack to the film Any Given Sunday (1999). It was the last single by the band for ten years, until "Skinny Little Bitch" in 2010.

Background
"Be a Man" was initially recorded during sessions for the band's third studio album Celebrity Skin (1998). The band, however, left the song off the album as they felt it was not cohesive with the rest of the record. On December 2, 1999, the song was uploaded online as a free digital download.

Critical reception
Chuck Taylor of Billboard referred to the song as "a slice of femcore" and praised Love's vocal performance.

Music video
The video (directed by Joseph Kahn) for Be a Man features a blue-haired Courtney Love with a dress in the same color in a football field, interacting with, seducing and French-kissing the game players from the film as a rain starts. It is the first Hole video not to feature Eric Erlandson (the only member remaining in the band besides Love at that point), plus it also featured her naked in the video.

Track listings and formats
 CD single
 "Be a Man" (radio edit) – 3:18
 "Be a Man" (album version) – 3:18
 "Whatever It Takes" (performed by P.O.D.) – 4:02

Credits and personnel
Credits and personnel are adapted from the Any Given Sunday album liner notes.
 Courtney Love – writer, performer, producer
 Eric Erlandson – writer, performer, producer
 Billy Corgan – writer
 Melissa Auf der Maur – performer, producer
 Patty Schemel – performer, producer
 Michael Beinhorn – producer
 Jack Joseph Puig – mixing
 Bob Ludwig – mastering

References

2000 singles
Hole (band) songs
Music videos directed by Joseph Kahn
Songs with feminist themes
Songs written by Billy Corgan
Songs written by Eric Erlandson
Songs written by Courtney Love
1997 songs
Song recordings produced by Michael Beinhorn